The Moscow Interbank Currency Exchange or MICEX was a stock exchange that operated in Russia from 1992 to 2011. MICEX was the leading Russian stock exchange and one of the largest universal stock exchanges in Eastern Europe. It merged with the Russian Trading System in 2011, creating Moscow Exchange.

MICEX consisted of about 550 participating organizations and members, which traded for their clients. In 2006 the volume of transactions on the MICEX reached 20.38 trillion rubles (US$754.9 billion), representing more than 90% of the total turnover of the leading stock exchanges in the Russian stock market. About 239 Russian companies were listed, with a market capitalization of US$950 billion as of December 2010.

History 

MICEX started with currency auctions in November 1989 as an initiative by the Foreign trade and investment bank of the USSR. Thus, for the first time the market ruble exchange rate to dollar was established. In January 1992 it became the main platform for carrying out currency transactions for banks and enterprises.

Until July 1992 the rate in the Moscow Interbank Stock Exchange was used by the Central Bank for the official quotation of ruble to foreign currencies. In the mid-1990s preparation for trading corporate securities and futures began.

On 19 December 2011, MICEX merged with the Russian Trading System to form a single entity known as MICEX-RTS that was expected to become a leading stock exchange globally for trading across asset classes and to advance Russia's plans to turn Moscow into an international financial centre. The goals of the merger included the optimisation of the Russian stock market, the reduction of the number of organisations with overlapping functions, the creation of a single platform for issuers, traders and investors, the reduction of transaction costs, and easier trading.

Problems in merging the infrastructure resulted in computer errors in trades, something that had not happened on the merged exchanges for a decade: on the first day of trades, there was a short period of computer glitches when the clearing system malfunctioned, which resulted in registering multiple unsanctioned deals, with some traders suffering losses.

A new brand for the united exchange was unveiled in the first half of 2012.

References

External links

 

Companies based in Moscow
Financial services companies of Russia
Stock exchanges in Russia
Futures exchanges
Financial services companies established in 1992
1992 establishments in Russia
Defunct stock exchanges